State Route 142 (SR 142), also known as Carbon Canyon Road for most of its length, is a state highway in the U.S. state of California that connects Brea in Orange County with Chino Hills in San Bernardino County. The eastern portion of the route is known as Chino Hills Parkway.

Running from State Route 90, Imperial Highway, in Brea to State Route 71 in Chino Hills, SR 142 is a popular shortcut from the business centers of Brea and surrounding Orange County to the Inland Empire. The road has multiple tight curves, so travel is not recommended for long vehicles, such as big rigs.

Route description

SR 142 begins in the city of Brea as Valencia Avenue at a junction with SR 90. The road heads northeast to an intersection with Carbon Canyon Road, which assumes the designation of SR 142 and continues east through Carbon Canyon Regional Park. SR 142 continues into the community of Olinda before crossing into the Sleepy Hollow area of the city of Chino Hills in San Bernardino County.

SR 142 continues northeast through Chino Hills to an intersection, where it continues eastbound on Chino Hills Parkway. The highway ends at an interchange with SR 71 on the border of Chino Hills and Chino, near the California Institution for Men, a state prison.

SR 142 is part of the California Freeway and Expressway System, and is part of the National Highway System, a network of highways that are considered essential to the country's economy, defense, and mobility by the Federal Highway Administration. SR 142 is eligible to be included in the State Scenic Highway System, but it is not officially designated as a scenic highway by the California Department of Transportation.

History
In 1933, a road from Brea to Chino was added to the state highway system. It was designated as Route 177 in 1935. In the 1964 state highway renumbering, this became part of SR 142. A routing from Chino to Upland was added to the state highway system as Route 274 in 1959, and was added to SR 142 in the 1964 renumbering from SR 71 to SR 30 (later SR 210), but no highway has been built along that route.

Major intersections

See also

References

External links

California @ AARoads.com - State Route 142
Caltrans: Route 142 highway conditions
California Highways: SR 142

142
State Route 142
State Route 142
Brea, California
Chino Hills (California)